Abderrahmane Benhamida (born 21 October 1931 in Dellys, died 5 September 2010 in Algiers) was an Algerian independence fighter and politician who served in the government of Algeria as Minister of National Education from 1962 to 1963.  After the crisis of 1988, he became a co-founder (with Benyoucef Benkhedda and others) of El Oumma, an effort to bring together Islamist and Nationalist parties.

References

1931 births
Algerian people
People from Dellys
People from Dellys District
People from Boumerdès Province
Kabyle people
Education ministers of Algeria
2010 deaths
21st-century Algerian people